Edward Chapin may refer to:

 Edward Payson Chapin (1831–1863), American lawyer and soldier
 Edward Albert Chapin (1894–1969), American entomologist